Ho Ion-sang (born 2 September 1961 in Macau) is a member of the Legislative Assembly of Macau. He ran for Legislative Assembly in the 2009 legislative election. He is a member of Union for Promoting Progress a pan-establishment party in Macau.

Election results

See also
 List of members of the Legislative Assembly of Macau

References

1961 births
Living people
Cantonese people
Members of the Legislative Assembly of Macau